Kevin Bridgens (born 21 December 1961) is a South African cricketer. He played in 44 first-class and 46 List A matches for Boland and Western Province from 1986/87 to 1992/93.

See also
 List of Boland representative cricketers

References

External links
 

1961 births
Living people
South African cricketers
Boland cricketers
Western Province cricketers
Cricketers from Cape Town